The velvet asity (Philepitta castanea) is a species of bird in the family Philepittidae. It is endemic to Madagascar.

Its natural habitat is subtropical or tropical moist lowland forests.

Male P. castanea have yellow tips to its feathers when newly molted, but these wear off, leaving the bird all black; at the same time, a green wattle grows above the eye. The female is greenish.

Velvet asities eat berries and other fruit in undergrowth, and they build hanging nests with a little roof over the entrance.

References

 https://www.britannica.com/animal/asity#ref129199

External links

Philepitta
Birds described in 1776
Taxonomy articles created by Polbot